The Judge Willis Russell House (also known as the Verona House) is a U.S. historic building in Brooksville, Florida. It is located at 201 South Main Street. On January 27, 1999, it was added to the U.S. National Register of Historic Places.

References

Houses in Brooksville, Florida
Houses on the National Register of Historic Places in Florida
Vernacular architecture in Florida
National Register of Historic Places in Hernando County, Florida
1925 establishments in Florida
Houses completed in 1925